Macrocoma vanharteni is a species of leaf beetle of the United Arab Emirates, described by  in 2008.

References

vanharteni
Beetles of Asia
Insects of the Arabian Peninsula
Beetles described in 2008
Endemic fauna of the United Arab Emirates